The Vicenza American High School (VHS) is a European Department of Defense Education Activity DoDEA high school located in Vicenza, Italy, on Caserma Ederle, an Italian-owned NATO base that is part of the Southern European Task Force (SETAF).

It was founded in 1954 by Eric Hall.

Course selection

Business programs
 Business and Personal Finance
 Career Practicum
 International Business Management

English as a Second Language (ESL)

English/Language Arts

 AP Language
 AP Literature
 Language 9
 Language 10
 Language 11
 Language 12

Fine Arts
 Drawing
 Fundamentals Of Art
 Painting
 Photography
 Sculpture

Foreign Language
 AP Italian
 Italian I
 Italian II
 Italian III
 Italian IV
 Spanish I
 Spanish II
 Spanish III
 Spanish IV

Health Education
 Health 
 Nutrition

Host Nation

JROTC

Mathematics
 AP Calculus
 AP Statistics
 Algebra I
 Algebra II
 Discrete Math
 Geometry
 Pre-Calculus

Music
 Band I
 Band II 
 Band III
 Beginning Chorus
 Intermediate Chorus

Physical Education
 Conditioning
 Physical Education (P.E.)

Professional Technical Studies
 Adobe Photoshop
 Microsoft Excel
 Microsoft PowerPoint
 Microsoft Word
 Video Communication III
 Video Communications II
 Video Communications I
 Yearbook

Science
 AP Biology
 AP Chemistry
 Biology
 Chemistry
 Human Anatomy
 Physics

Social Studies
 AP Global Studies
 AP Government
 AP Psychology
 AP United States History
 Global Studies I
 Global Studies II
 Government
 Model United Nations (MUN)
 Psychology
 United States History

Special Needs Programs

Visual Arts

Clubs

 Social Studies Honors Society (SSHS)
 National Honors Society (NHS)
 Spanish Honors Society (SHS)
 Italian Honors Society (IHS)
 Math Honors Society (MHS)
 Strait and Gay Alliance (SAGA)
 Red Cross
 Speech and Debate 
 Speech and Debate is by far the largest club at Vicenza High School, with over 10% of the student body participating. 
 German Club
 French Club 
 Video Game Club
 Computer Science Club
 Model United Nations (MUN)
 Model United States Senate (MUSS)
 Environmental Club

Athletics

The high school varsity teams are nicknamed the Cougars. Varsity sports teams include: Boys' and Girls' Basketball, Soccer, Volleyball, Track & Field, Cross Country, Rifle Team, Tennis, Football, Wrestling, Softball, Baseball and Cheerleading.

Championships 

 1981
 ASIL Football Champions
 ASIL Wrestling Champions
 1984
 ASIL Boys Cross Country Champions
 ASIL Boys Basketball Champions
 ASIL Girls Basketball Champions
 ASIL Boys Track and Field Champions
 ASIL Boys Singles Tennis Champions & Team Champions (Doubles Team finished 2nd)
1985 
 ASIL Boys Basketball Champions
1990
ASIL Boys Football Champions
ASIL Boys Track and Field Champions
 Stars and Stripes Athlete of The Year (Howard Buckner)
 All European Boys Football, Basketball and Track (Howard Buckner)
1992
 ASIL Boys Football Champions
1993
 ASIL Boys Football Champions
 ASIL Boys Cross Country Champions
 ASIL Girls Cross Country Champions
1999
 D-III All European Football Champions
2001
 ASIL Boys Basketball Champions
2003
 ASIL Boys Volleyball Champions
2005
All Europe Wrestling Championship Runner Up (Gary King)
2006 
All Europe Wrestling Championship (Shane Hinton)
Athlete of the Year (Shane Hinton)
2007
All Europe Wrestling Championship Runner Up (Kyle Kaus)
2008
 D-III Girls Basketball Runner Up
 Cheerleading 2nd Place at Europeans
All Europe Wrestling Championship Runner Up (Kyle Kaus)
3rd Place  Dragster Race PTS Expo (Tia Lopez)
2009
 D-III Baseball Runner-Up
 D-III Boys Track & Field 2nd Place at Europeans
 D-III Girls Track & Field 2nd Place at Europeans
 D-II South Champions (Football)
 All Europe Wrestling Championship (Kyle Kaus)
 D-III European 3rd Place (Softball)
2010
 D-II South Championships for Girls Soccer
 D-II 3rd Place European Tournament/ Mediterranean Champions (Girls Volleyball)
2011
 D-II European Champions (Girls Basketball)Coach Michael F. James, Sr.
 D-II 2nd Place European Championships (Girls Soccer/Baseball)
4th place European Championships Triple Jump (Gary Donald)
Gary Donald number one long jumper in Europeans
Athlete of the Year (Gary Donald)
2012
 D-II European Champions (Wrestling)
2013
 D-II European Champions (Softball)
 D-II European Runners-up (Baseball/Soccer)
 D-II European 3rd Place at Europeans (Boys Basketball)
 D-II European Champions (Wrestling)
2014
 D-II European Champions (Softball)
 D-II European Runners-up (Baseball)
2016 
 D-| European Runners-up (Girls Basketball)
 D-I European Runners-up (Girls Volleyball)

Notable attendees

 Sharon Tate (VHS 1961), Hollywood actress, who was murdered by members of the Manson clan.
 Chip Flowers (VHS 1992), Delaware State Treasurer and co-chair of the National Democratic State Treasurers.  He was the first African-American statewide elected official in the state. 
 John Bonamego, (VHS 1981), John Attended VHS and played football for the Cougars until his Sophomore year. John is currently the Special Teams coach for the Detroit Lions.
 Adrian Murrell (1988 - Adrian attended junior high in Vicenza, but moved to Hawaii for high school and did not graduate from VHS), NFL Running back, who played for the New York Jets, Arizona Cardinals, Washington Redskins and Dallas Cowboys.

References

External links
 School Website

Schools in Veneto
Vicenza
Department of Defense Education Activity